TecMagik Entertainment Ltd. was a video game development and publishing company that released games for 8-bit and 16-bit games consoles between 1991 and 1993.

Releases
Andre Agassi Tennis
Champions of Europe
The New Zealand Story
Pac-Mania
Pink Goes to Hollywood
Populous: The Promised Lands
Shadow of the Beast
Sylvester and Tweety in Cagey Capers

Cancelled game
TecMagik was due to release a game, "Deadly Honor", starring Steven Seagal, on PlayStation and Nintendo 64 but this game was cancelled.

Defunct video game companies of the United Kingdom

References